Stara Varoš is an Ottoman-era neighbourhood in Podgorica, Montenegro. It was the core of the city between the 15th and 19th century. Much of the neighbourhood was damaged or destroyed during the bombing of Podgorica in World War II, though some buildings and monuments remain.

Notable sights
Sahat kula (Clock Tower of Hadži-paša Osmanagić)
The Natural History Museum of Montenegro
Depedogen (Ribnica fortress)
Osmanagića and Starodoganjska mosques
The Old Bridge over the Ribnica (Adži-paša's bridge)

See also
List of Podgorica neighbourhoods and suburbs#Drač and Stara Varoš

References

Neighbourhoods of Podgorica